Mohideen Mohammed Amanullah, also known as Mohamed Amanulla or Mohamed Amunulla, is a Sri Lankan football coach and a former player.

He was a player and captain for Sri Lanka national football team, and also played for Ratnam SC. Amanulla helped Sri Lanka win the 1995 South Asian Gold Cup, scoring 3 goals in the tournament.

Amanulla was the coach of  the national team from 2009 to 2010. Amanulla have also coached Renown SC and Saunders SC.

Honours

Sri Lanka
 SAFF Championship: 1995

References

External links
 

Living people
Sri Lankan footballers
Sri Lanka international footballers
Ratnam SC players
Sri Lankan football managers
Sri Lanka national football team managers
Sri Lankan Muslims
Association football forwards
Year of birth missing (living people)